John Rankin Franklin (May 6, 1820 – January 11, 1878) was a Congressional Representative for the U.S. state of Maryland. He also served as a member of the Maryland House of Delegates in 1843 and as Speaker of the Maryland House of Delegates in 1849.

Early life
John Rankin Franklin was born in Worcester County, Maryland, and graduated from Jefferson College in 1836. He then studied law and was admitted to the bar in 1841.

Career
Franklin opened a law practice in Snow Hill, Maryland. He was a member of the Maryland House of Delegates, representing Worcester County, in 1843, and served as president of the Maryland State Board of Public Works in 1851. He was elected as a Whig to the Thirty-third Congress, and served the 1st Congressional district of Maryland from March 4, 1853, until March 3, 1855. He again became a member of the Maryland House of Delegates and served as the Speaker of the Maryland House of Delegates in 1849. Franklin was a judge of the first judicial circuit of Maryland from 1867 until his death.

Personal life
His daughter Sarah E. married George M. Upshur. Her son Franklin Upshur was an assistant state's attorney.

Franklin died on January 11, 1878, in Snow Hill. He is buried in the churchyard of Makemie Memorial Presbyterian Church in Snow Hill.

References

1820 births
1878 deaths
Speakers of the Maryland House of Delegates
People from Snow Hill, Maryland
Washington & Jefferson College alumni
Whig Party members of the United States House of Representatives from Maryland
19th-century American politicians